Chinese imperialism refers to the expansion of China's political, economic, and cultural influence beyond the boundaries of China. Depending on the commentors, this word could refers to one or more of the Chinese expansionism, wolf warrior diplomacy, civilizing mission, China's oversea espionage missions, authoritarianism, and Uyghur genocide. Although there has not been a long-standing imperial regime in China after the Xinhai Revolution, and the country is now constitutionally a People's Republic, some still refer to China as an imperialist country, such as the New People's Army, some Maoist parties, and the New Left (especially some of the Chinese New Left). China's construction and investment in Africa has also been accused of "neo-colonialism".

Cases of discussion 
Since the Chinese economic reform of 1978, China became a new economic, military, and political great power. As China transformed, there were hopes that the Chinese government would give up its expansionist ideas. However, since the rise of Chinese Communist Party general secretary Xi Jinping to power, and increasing territorial conflicts which China stated most of their disputed lands belong to China, it is generally believed that China continues to adhere to irredentist claims.

Annexation of Tibet 

The annexation of Tibet by the People's Republic of China (called the "Peaceful Liberation of Tibet" by the Chinese government and the "Chinese invasion of Tibet" by the Tibetan Government in Exile) were the series of events from 1950 to 1959 by which the People's Republic of China (PRC) gained control of Tibet. These regions came under the control of China after attempts by the Government of Tibet to gain international recognition, efforts to modernize its military, negotiations between the Government of Tibet and the PRC, a military conflict in the Chamdo area of western Kham in October 1950, and the eventual acceptance of the Seventeen Point Agreement by the Government of Tibet under Chinese pressure in October 1951. The Government of Tibet remained in place under the authority of China until the 1959 Tibetan uprising, when the Dalai Lama was forced to flee into exile in India and after which the Government of Tibet and Tibetan social structures were dissolved.

South Asian border disputes 

Five Fingers of Tibet is the Chinese strategy originally propounded by CCP chairman Mao Zedong to annex Ladakh (disputed territory), Nepal, Sikkim (disputed territory), Bhutan, and Arunachal Pradesh (disputed territory). According to the Five Fingers of Tibet strategy, Tibet is considered as China's right hand palm, with five fingers on its periphery: Ladakh, Nepal, Sikkim, Bhutan, and Arunachal Pradesh, with the ultimate objective to assert China's claim and authority over these regions.

East China Sea disputes 

With the 1978 Chinese economic reform launched by Deng Xiaoping, China has increased its political stance, its influence, and its power abroad. On one side, China remains deeply neutral and is not involving itself in any conflict  , and the land borders are stable .  China has increased its influence, while using military and economic wealth and claims to island territories that have caused anxiety in neighbors to the east, such as the Philippines and Japan.

South China Sea disputes 

The South China Sea disputes involve both island and maritime claims of China and the claims of several neighboring sovereign states in the region, namely Brunei, the Republic of China (ROC/Taiwan), Indonesia, Malaysia, the Philippines, and Vietnam. The disputes are over islands, reefs, banks, and other features in the South China Sea, including the Spratly Islands, Paracel Islands, Scarborough Shoal, boundaries in the Gulf of Tonkin, and the waters near the Indonesian Natuna Islands.

Belt and Road Initiative 

Jeffrey Reeves (2018) argues that since 2012, CCP general secretary Xi Jinping has demonstrated "a concerted imperialist policy" towards its developing neighbor states to the south and west, especially Mongolia, Kazakhstan, Tajikistan, Kyrgyzstan, Afghanistan, Pakistan, Nepal, Myanmar, Cambodia, Laos, and Vietnam. This is associated with criticism of debt trap diplomacy.

Xinjiang internment camps 
Xinjiang internment camps were established in the late 2010s under Xi Jinping's administration. Human Rights Watch says that they have been used to indoctrinate Uyghurs and other Muslims since 2017 as part of a "people's war on terror", a policy announced in 2014. The camps have been criticized by the governments of many countries and human rights organizations for alleged human rights abuses, including mistreatment, rape, and torture, with some of them alleging genocide.

Cultural imperialism 
According to The Diplomat, Korean commentators have said that there is a dimension of cultural imperialism by China, including China's censorship of Korean content, and claiming some Korean historical figures as Chinese.

See also 

 Anti-Americanism
 American imperialism
 Chinese Century
 Chinese police overseas service stations
 Document Number Nine
 Han chauvinism
 Han nationalism
 Operation Fox Hunt
 Nanyang (region)
 Russian imperialism
 Salami slicing tactics
 Sino-Vietnamese conflicts (1979–1991)
 Social imperialism
 Soviet Empire
 String of Pearls (Indian Ocean)
 Unrestricted Warfare

References 

Neocolonialism
Imperialism
Political history of China